The Teen Titans are a superhero team appearing in American comic books published by DC Comics, frequently in eponymous monthly series. As the group's name indicates, the members are teenage superheroes, many of who have acted as sidekicks to DC's premier superheroes in the Justice League. The original team later becomes known as the Titans when the members age out of their teenage years, while the Teen Titans name is continued by subsequent generations of young heroes. First appearing in 1964 in The Brave and the Bold #54, the team was formed by Kid Flash (Wally West), Robin (Dick Grayson), and Aqualad (Garth) before adopting the name Teen Titans in issue 60 with the addition of Wonder Girl (Donna Troy) to their ranks.

Over the decades, DC has cancelled and relaunched Teen Titans many times, and a variety of characters have been featured heroes in its pages. Significant early additions to the initial quartet of Titans were Speedy (Roy Harper), Aquagirl (Tula), Bumblebee (Karen Beecher), Hawk (Hank Hall), Dove (Don Hall), Harlequin (Duela Dent), and three non-costumed heroes: boxer Mal Duncan, psychic Lilith, and caveman Gnarrk. The series would not become a genuine hit until its 1980s revival as The New Teen Titans under writer Marv Wolfman and artist George Pérez. This run depicted the original Titans now as young adults and introduced new characters Cyborg (Victor Stone), Starfire (Koriand'r), and Raven (Rachel Roth), as well as the former Doom Patrol member Beast Boy (Garfield Logan) under his new alias of Changeling, who would all become enduring fan favorites. A high point for the series both critically and commercially was its "The Judas Contract" storyline, where the Teen Titans are betrayed by their teammate Terra (Tara Markov).

The 1990s featured a Teen Titans team composed entirely of new members before the previous members returned in the series Titans, which ran from the late 1990s to the early 2000s. Subsequent stories in the 2000s introduced a radically different Teen Titans team made up of newer DC Comics sidekicks such as Robin III (Tim Drake), Wonder Girl II (Cassie Sandsmark), and Impulse / Kid Flash II (Bart Allen), as well as Superboy (Kon-El), some of who had previously featured in the similar title Young Justice. Later prominent additions from this era included Miss Martian (M'gann M'orzz), Ravager (Rose Wilson), Supergirl (Kara Zor-El), Kid Devil, and Blue Beetle III (Jaime Reyes). Concurrently, DC also published Titans, which featured some of the original and 1980s members now as adults, led by Dick Grayson in his adult persona of Nightwing. DC's The New 52 reboot in 2011 later brought new characters to the founding roster, including Solstice (Kiran Singh), Bunker (Miguel Jose Barragan), and Skitter (Celine Patterson), although this volume proved commercially and critically disappointing for DC. In 2016, DC used the Titans Hunt and DC Rebirth storylines to re-establish the group's original founding members and history, reuniting these classic heroes as the Titans, while introducing a new generation of Teen Titans led by Robin V (Damian Wayne) with Aqualad II (Jackson Hyde) and Kid Flash III (Wallace West) as the team's latest members alongside team mainstays Starfire, Raven and Beast Boy.

The Teen Titans have been adapted to other media numerous times, and have enjoyed a higher profile since Cartoon Network's animated series in the early-to-mid 2000s and its DC Nation spin-off Teen Titans Go!, both of which featured Robin, Starfire, Cyborg, Raven, and Beast Boy as the primary members of the team. A live action series premiered on DC Universe in 2018. Its characters and stories were also adapted into the 2010s animated series Young Justice. Within DC Comics, the Teen Titans have been an influential group of characters taking prominent roles in all of the publisher's major company-wide crossover stories. Many villains who face the Titans have since taken on a larger role within the publisher's fictional universe, such as the assassin Deathstroke, the demon Trigon, and the evil organization H.I.V.E.

Publication history

Original incarnation
Robin (Dick Grayson), Kid Flash (Wally West) and Aqualad (Garth) team up to defeat a weather-controlling villain known as Mister Twister in The Brave and the Bold #54 (July 1964) by writer Bob Haney and artist Bruno Premiani. They appeared under the name "Teen Titans" in The Brave and the Bold #60 (July 1965), joined by Wonder Woman's younger sister Wonder Girl (Donna Troy). After being featured in Showcase #59 (December 1965), the Teen Titans were spun off into their own series with Teen Titans #1 by Haney and artist Nick Cardy.

The series' original premise had the Teen Titans helping teenagers and answering calls. Comics historian Les Daniels noted that Haney "took some ribbing for the writing style that described the Teen Titans as 'the Cool Quartet' or 'the Fab Foursome'. The attempt to reach the youth culture then embracing performers like The Beatles and Bob Dylan impressed some observers." Green Arrow's sidekick Speedy makes guest appearances before officially joining the team in Teen Titans #19. Aqualad takes a leave of absence from the group in the same issue, but makes several later guest appearances, sometimes with girlfriend Aquagirl. Neal Adams was called upon to rewrite and redraw a Teen Titans story which had been written by Len Wein and Marv Wolfman. The story, titled "Titans Fit the Battle of Jericho!", would have introduced DC's first African American superhero, but was rejected by publisher Carmine Infantino. The revised story appeared in Teen Titans #20 (March–April 1969). Wolfman and Gil Kane created an origin for Wonder Girl in Teen Titans #22 (July–Aug. 1969) and introduced her new costume. Psychic Lilith Clay and Mal Duncan also join the group. Beast Boy of the Doom Patrol makes a guest appearance seeking membership, but was rejected as too young at the time; existing heroes Hawk and Dove, a duo of teenaged superpowered brothers, appear in issue #21; and time-displaced caveman Gnarrk aids the team in two issues.

The series explored events such as inner-city racial tension and protests against the Vietnam War. One storyline beginning in issue #25 (February 1970) saw the Titans deal with the accidental death of a peace activist, leading them to reconsider their methods. As a result, the Teen Titans briefly abandoned their identities to work as ordinary civilians, but the effort was quickly abandoned. Along the way, Aqualad left the series and the character of Mr. Jupiter, who was Lilith's mentor and employer, was introduced. He financially backed the Titans for a brief period. The series was canceled with #43 (January–February 1973).

1970s revival

The series resumed with issue #44 (November 1976). The stories included the introductions of African American superheroine Bumblebee and former supervillainess-turned-superheroine Harlequin in issue #48 and the introduction of the "Teen Titans West" team in issues #50–52 consisting of a number of other teen heroes, including Bat-Girl (Betty Kane) and Golden Eagle. The revival was short-lived and the series was cancelled as of issue #53 (February 1978), which featured an origin story. At the end, the heroes realized that, now that they were in their early 20s, they had outgrown the name the "Teen" Titans. In the last panel, without speaking, they all go their separate ways.

The title appeared again in 1999 for Giant Teen Titans Annual #1 (1967 issue), a one-shot special that reprinted selected Silver Age stories in the 1960s-style 80-Page Giant format.

The New Teen Titans (1980–1996) 

DC Comics Presents #26 (October 1980) introduced a new team of Titans, anchored by Robin, Wonder Girl, and Kid Flash and soon followed by The New Teen Titans #1 (November 1980). The series, created by writer Marv Wolfman and artist George Pérez, re-introduced Beast Boy as Changeling and introduced the machine man Cyborg, the alien Starfire, and the dark empath Raven. Raven, an expert manipulator, forms the group to fight her demonic father Trigon the Terrible and the team remains together.

Wolfman and Pérez's working relationship quickly evolved to the point where they were plotting the series jointly. Wolfman recalled that "once George moved to the same town I lived in, only five blocks or so away, we usually got together for lunch and would work out a story over the next few hours. In many cases I would then go home and write up a plot based on it, or sometimes George would take the verbal plotting we did and take it from there."

The team's adversaries included Deathstroke the Terminator, a mercenary who takes a contract to kill the Titans to fulfill a job his son had been unable to complete. This led to perhaps the most notable Titans storyline of the era. 1984's "The Judas Contract", in Tales of the Teen Titans #42–44 and Tales of the Teen Titans Annual #3, featured a psychopathic girl named Terra with the power to manipulate Earth and all Earth-related materials. She infiltrates the Titans in order to destroy them. "The Judas Contract" won the Comics Buyer's Guide Fan Award for "Favorite Comic Book Story" of 1984 and was later reprinted as a standalone trade paperback in 1988. Robin adopts the identity of Nightwing, while Wally West gives up his Kid Flash persona and quits the Titans. It also featured the introduction of a new member in Jericho, Deathstroke's other son.

Other notable New Teen Titans stories included "A Day in the Lives...", presenting a day in the team members' personal lives; "Who is Donna Troy?", depicting Robin investigating Wonder Girl's origins; and "We Are Gathered Here Today...", telling the story of Wonder Girl's wedding. Tales of the New Teen Titans, a four-part limited series by Wolfman and Pérez, was published in 1982, detailing the back-stories of Cyborg, Raven, Changeling, and Starfire. Wolfman wrote a series of New Teen Titans drug awareness comic books which were published in cooperation with The President's Drug Awareness Campaign in 1983–1984. The first was pencilled by Pérez and sponsored by the Keebler Company, the second was illustrated by Ross Andru and underwritten by the American Soft Drink Industry, and the third was drawn by Adrian Gonzales and financed by IBM.

The New Teen Titans (vol. 2)
The New Teen Titans relaunched with a new #1 issue in August 1984 as part of a new initiative at DC informally referred to as "hardcover/softcover". The New Teen Titans along with Legion of Super-Heroes and Batman and the Outsiders were the first and only titles included in this program. The same stories were published twice, first in a more expensive edition with higher-quality printing and paper distributed exclusively to comic book specialty stores, then republished a year later in the original format, distributed to newsstands. The title was renamed Tales of the Teen Titans with issue #41, while a new concurrently published series named The New Teen Titans (vol. 2) launched with a new #1 following the release of Tales of the Teen Titans #44 and Annual #3, the conclusion of the "Judas Contract" storyline. After both titles ran new stories for one year, with Tales of the Teen Titans #45–58 taking place prior to the events of The New Teen Titans (vol. 2) #1, and a filler issue reprinting a digest-only story and the original preview story from DC Comics Presents #26, the series began reprinting the first 31 issues of the "hardcover" series (sans several back-up stories focusing on Tamaran that ran in New Teen Titans #14–18), the first Annual, and the lead story from the second Annual, before being cancelled with issue #91.

Issue #1 of The New Teen Titans (vol. 2) created controversy when Grayson and Starfire were depicted in bed together, although it had been established for some time that they were a couple. The initial storyline, "The Terror of Trigon", featured Raven's demon father attempting to take over Earth and Raven's own struggle to remain good despite Trigon's demonic blood inside her. Pérez left the series after issue #5. José Luis García-López followed Pérez as the title's artist and Eduardo Barreto followed García-López. Paul Levitz scripted and wrote several issues of the Brother Blood saga when Wolfman briefly left.

Name changed to The New Titans 
Pérez temporarily returned with issue #50, when the series took the name The New Titans without the "Teen" prefix, as the characters were no longer teenagers.

Issue #50 told a new origin story for Wonder Girl, her link to Wonder Woman having been severed due to retcons created in the aftermath of Crisis on Infinite Earths. Pérez sketched through issues #55, 57 and 60, while only providing layouts for issues #58–59 and 61, with artist Tom Grummett finishing pencils and Bob McLeod as inker. Pérez remained as cover inker to issues #62–67. He would return for the series finale #130 (Feb. 1996) providing cover art. Issues #60 and #61 were part of a five-part crossover with Batman, "A Lonely Place of Dying" and along with issue #65, featured the debut of Tim Drake as the third Robin.

The brief return of Perez and the addition of Tom Grummett failed to move sales for the book, which were starting to decline. Furthermore, the addition of Danny Chase (a teenage psychic) drew negative fan response due to his abusive attitude towards the rest of the team. Believing Wolfman had grown stagnant, DC assigned Wolfman a new editor, Jonathan Peterson, and gave Peterson authority to override Wolfman over the direction of the book.

With Peterson controlling the book's direction, the series was rapidly overhauled. The Wildebeest, a villain who used proxies and surrogates to hide his true identity while vexing the Titans, was expanded to a full army of villains called the Wildebeest Society and revealed to be a front for the remaining members of the supervillain group the H.I.V.E. The group fell under the control of Titan Jericho, who in turn was being possessed by the corrupted souls of Azarath. During the "Titans Hunt" storyline that followed (#71–84), Cyborg was destroyed and rebuilt, along with being lobotomized; Danny Chase and Arella (Raven's mother) were killed and resurrected as the gestalt being Phantasm (an identity created by Chase early in the series); while Raven, Jericho, and obscure Titans ally Golden Eagle were killed. New character Pantha (based on plans for a female Wildcat character Wolfman conceived in the mid-'80s) joined the team, along with Deathstroke and Red Star. Deathstroke was also given his own solo book and the team received its first crossover tie-in since Millennium, with The New Titans #81 being part of the "War of the Gods" storyline.

Peterson also saw the launch of Team Titans, which featured a new genetically modified (and heroic) doppelganger of Terra and Donna Troy, who was depowered in the "Total Chaos" crossover. Peterson left the book before "Total Chaos" concluded, leaving Wolfman to deal with the fallout from Peterson's editorially mandated storylines, including the final break-up between Starfire and Nightwing as a couple, the return of Speedy as Arsenal, and the resurrection of Raven as a villain.

Following Zero Hour: Crisis in Time!, the series saw a revamp: Nightwing was removed from the series by Batman editorial and a roster of new young heroes such as Damage and Impulse were inserted into the team to try and renew interest, along with Team Titan survivors Mirage and Terra II. New Green Lantern Kyle Rayner was also brought onto the title and given a prominent romance with Donna Troy, whose marriage with Terry Long had collapsed in the pages of Team Titans before the book's cancellation. Sales saw a collapse and despite several crossovers with other books (Damage, Green Lantern, Darkstars, and Deathstroke), the series was cancelled with issue #130. The series finale saw the return of Blackfire as an ally, as the Titans purged Raven of evil once again in order to prevent Raven and the revived Citadel Empire from reconquering the Vega star system.

The New Teen Titans and the Uncanny X-Men

The New Teen Titans was widely thought of as DC's answer to the increasingly popular Uncanny X-Men from Marvel Comics, as both series featured all-new members and depicted young heroes from disparate backgrounds whose internal conflicts were as integral to the series as was their combat against villains. The two teams met in the 1982 crossover one-shot entitled "Apokolips... Now", which teamed Darkseid, Deathstroke and Dark Phoenix against both teams. The story was written by Chris Claremont and drawn by Walt Simonson and Terry Austin.

New Titans: Games
In 1989, Marv Wolfman and George Perez began planning a prestige format special, their first work together on the franchise since Perez left after The New Teen Titans (vol. 2) #5. The project was put on hold when it was decided instead to have Perez return to the main book as artist and for their first project back together to be "Who Is Wonder Girl?" instead.

Over the course of 1989 and 1990, George Perez and Marv Wolfman continued to work on Games with over half the project being completed. But the ascension of Jonathan Peterson as editor of the series and Perez moving off of New Titans in order to work on The Infinity Gauntlet for Marvel led to the book being shelved.

In the early '00s, Marv Wolfman and George Perez approached DC about completing the book as a stand-alone graphic novel. The book was completed in 2010 and published in 2011.

The plot had the New Titans be forced by King Faraday to go after a mysterious mastermind who forces his victims to play deadly "games" for his amusement. The story features several major events (the deaths of King Faraday and Cyborg's longtime love interest Sarah Simms and Danny Chase being maimed) that make it impossible to fit into canon, reducing it to an alternate universe side story in Teen Titans lore.

Teen Titans Spotlight
Due to fan backlash over the hardcover/softcover move to the direct market with the main title, a new newsstand Titans book was launched in August 1986 called Teen Titans Spotlight. The series was an anthology series and featured individual members of the Titans in solo stories, often spanning multiple issues. The series also focused on former members of the group (such as Hawk and Aqualad) and the Brotherhood of Evil, detailing the formation of the second version of the group. As the move to the direct market effectively limited The New Teen Titans ability to be part of company-wide crossovers, two issues of Spotlight tied into the Millennium crossover event, with the second issue being the coda for the event.

The series failed to catch on and was cancelled in 1988, along with Tales of the Teen Titans.

Team Titans

The Team Titans were one of 100 groups sent back through time to prevent the birth of Lord Chaos, the son of Donna Troy and Terry Long. Their mission was to kill the pregnant Troy before she could give birth. Mirage, Killowat, Redwing, Terra, Nightrider, Prestor Jon and Battalion made up the team.

Teen Titans (vol. 2) (1996–1998)

Teen Titans was written and penciled by Dan Jurgens. It began in 1996 with a new #1 (October 1996), with Pérez as inker for the first 15 issues. Atom, who had become a teenager following the events of Zero Hour, leads the brand-new team (of Prysm, Joto, Risk and Argent). Arsenal became a mentor about halfway through and Captain Marvel Junior/ CM3 joins the team. The series ended in September 1998.

A contest was held in the letters pages to determine who would join the team. Robin (Tim Drake), won the vote, but editors on the Batman titles banned his appearance, forcing Jurgens to use Captain Marvel Jr. instead. His inclusion failed to boost sales and the series was then cancelled.

Titans (1999–2003)

The team returned in a three-issue miniseries, JLA/Titans: The Technis Imperative, featuring nearly every Titan and showcasing the return of Cyborg. This led into Titans, written by Devin K. Grayson, starting with Titans Secret Files and Origins #1 (March 1999).

This team consisted of Nightwing, Troia, Arsenal, Tempest, the Flash, Starfire, Cyborg, Changeling, Damage and Argent. One new member, Jesse Quick, joined. This team lasted until issue #50 (2002). The West Coast branch of the team, Titans L.A., appeared once, in the pages of Titans Secret Files and Origins #2.

Between Teen Titans and Titans, a new generation of young heroes formed a team in Young Justice, consisting of Superboy, Robin, Impulse, Wonder Girl, Secret and Arrowette. The two series concluded with the three-issue miniseries Titans/Young Justice: Graduation Day, which led to two new series: Teen Titans and Outsiders.

Teen Titans (vol. 3) (2003–2011) and Outsiders (vol. 3) (2003–2007)

Writer Geoff Johns' Teen Titans series began in 2003, after a three issue miniseries entitled Titans/Young Justice: Graduation Day, which saw Lilith's death and Donna Troy sent to another world after seemingly dying, along with the disbanding of the 1998–2002 Titans roster and the Young Justice team. The relaunch came on the heels of the debut of the Teen Titans cartoon on Cartoon Network and reflected DC Comics chief executive Dan DiDio's desire to rehabilitate the Titans as one of DC's top franchises. Launched at the same time was a companion series, a revived version of The Outsiders which featured Nightwing and Arsenal, along with several other Titans members (Captain Marvel Jr. and Starfire).

The series featured several of the main teenage heroes from the Young Justice roster (Robin, Superboy, Wonder Girl, Impulse) and Starfire, Cyborg and Changeling (now rebranded Beast Boy to reflect the cartoon). Raven later returned to the team, reborn in a new teenage body while Jericho was brought back, having escaped death by possessing and laying dormant inside his father Deathstroke's mind.

The series renewed interest in the Titans, but drew sharp complaints due to shifts in the personalities of the various Young Justice characters. Most notably, the decision to have Impulse rebrand himself Kid Flash and the decision to jettison his happy-go-lucky person in favor of a more serious personality. The series, under Geoff Johns, also dramatically retconned Superboy's origin with the revelation that he was a hybrid clone based on the combined DNA of Superman and Lex Luthor (a possibility Johns had first suggested in a fan letter published in the Superboy comic book several years before he was employed by DC).

Under Geoff Johns, the Teen Titans were front and center during the build-up and events of the Infinite Crisis crossover. During the lead-in of the crossover, Donna Troy came back in a four-part crossover miniseries with The Outsiders called "The Return of Donna Troy" while Superboy and Cassie Sandsmark became a couple. During Infinite Crisis, Superboy was killed by his evil doppelganger Superboy Prime, Cyborg was severely damaged by cosmic forces unleashed by Alexander Luthor Jr., Starfire was lost in space with several other heroes, while Kid Flash became lost in the Speed Force, re-emerging in the Flash uniform and having aged to adulthood after a failed attempt to stop Superboy Prime.

One Year Later and the post-Geoff Johns Titans

Following the events of Infinite Crisis, the Teen Titans fell into a state of chaos. Wonder Girl quit the group to join a cult she believed could resurrect Superboy, while Robin took a leave of absence to travel the globe with Batman and Nightwing. Changeling and Raven attempted to keep the Titans going, resulting in a massive open call membership drive that saw a large number of heroes come and join the roster, which was anchored by Beast Boy and Raven. New members include Miss Martian, Kid Devil, Zachary Zatara, Ravager, Bombshell (who like Terra I, was a traitor working for Deathstroke), Young Frankenstein, and Osiris.

During this period, Osiris was driven from the team due to a smear campaign launched by Amanda Waller after she manipulated him into killing a super-villain. The smear campaign against Osiris, along with the war between Black Adam and Intergang, led to Black Adam declaring war on the world. In the ensuing series of battles against the super-hero community, the Titans fought and lost a bloody battle with the villain, culminating in the deaths of Terra II and Young Frankenstein. The deaths led to Beast Boy resigning from the team to join the Doom Patrol along with Herald and Bumblebee, while Raven took a leave of absence in order to purge Jericho of the dark forces that were corrupting him.

Robin and Wonder Girl eventually rejoined the Titans (now located in San Francisco, California) and helped foil Bombshell's plan to frame Miss Martian as Deathstroke's latest mole in the team and allowed Raven to cleanse Jericho of the Azarathian corruption that had turned him evil. Geoff John's final arc on the series would introduce a new villainous "Titans East" team, led by Deathstroke and Batgirl Cassandra Cain.

Soon after, events related to the Countdown story arc impacted the Titans. Duela Dent and Bart Allen are killed; Cyborg leaves, and Supergirl joins and Blue Beetle is invited to train, but the two eventually leave, with the members joining the Justice League of America and Justice League International, respectively. The Titans fight the future, evil adult versions of the group (Titans Tomorrow) and Clock King and the Terror Titans, who are part of Darkseid's underground fight club for metahumans.

After the Batman R.I.P storyline, Robin leaves and Wonder Girl leads the team. Red Devil loses his powers after Brother Blood absorbs them. Miss Martian returns with several teen heroes liberated from the Dark Side Club. A new team is formed: Wonder Girl, Blue Beetle and the now-powerless Red Devil are joined by Kid Eternity and Static, with the new Aquagirl, Miss Martian and a reformed Bombshell signing up.

During the events of the Blackest Night crossover, some dead Titans are resurrected as members of the Black Lantern Corps. In the Titans: Blackest Night miniseries, an emergency team consisting of Donna Troy, Cyborg, Wonder Girl, Starfire, Beast Boy, Kid Flash and the new Hawk and Dove, is formed to defend the Tower. In the ensuing battle, the Hawk is killed after her predecessor Hank Hall tears her heart out. At the end of the Blackest Knight crossover, Hank Hall is resurrected and resumes his partnership with Dove. In the main series, Ravager and Jericho fight their father Deathstroke and the dead members of the Wilson family, resurrected as Black Lanterns.

During this time, several back-up stories begin to run in the series: one called "The Coven", starring Black Alice, Zachary Zatara and Traci 13 and later, one starring Ravager.

Later storylines involve the corruption of Wonder Girl at the hands of various factors (designed to address complaints about the character's abusive attitudes towards her teammates post-Infinite Crisis), Kid Devil is killed in battle, while Kid Eternity is revealed to have been beaten to death by the Calculator after being kidnapped by him.

J. T. Krul became the writer with issue #88 and penciler Nicola Scott became the book's artist. The issue's teaser shows a line-up of Superboy, Wonder Girl, Raven, Beast Boy, Kid Flash and Ravager. The Titans undergo this roster change in issue #87, the final issue before Krul's run. Following a mission to an alternate dimension to rescue Raven, the team splits. Bombshell and Aquagirl are missing in action, Miss Martian is in a coma and she and a powerless Static leave with Cyborg to go to Cadmus Labs in order to find a way to restore his powers.

Damian Wayne, the current Robin, is announced as a new team member, officially joining in #89. A series for Static was announced. In January 2011, new Titan Solstice debuted in the January 2011 Wonder Girl one-shot. She entered the main Teen Titans title following the crossover with the Red Robin series. During the crossover, Tim asks the Titans for help in tracking down the Calculator after he tries to kill his friend, Tam Fox. Tim rejoins the team as Red Robin (rather than Robin) but Cassie would remain the leader. Following this, Damian quits the team.

The book concluded with a three-part storyline spanning issues #98–100, which saw Superboy-Prime return to destroy the team. A large group of former Titans arrived and the series ultimately ended with Prime trapped in the Source Wall, seemingly for all eternity. The remainder of the issue consisted of pieces of artwork showcasing the various Teen Titans who appeared in that incarnation of the title, contributed by various DC artists.

Titans (vol. 2) (2008–2011)

A second ongoing Teen Titans series, titled Titans, launched in April 2008 with a cover date of June 2008, written by Judd Winick. The first issue was drawn by Ian Churchill and Norm Rapmund and the second was by Joe Benitez and Victor Llamas. The opening storyline follows the events of the Teen Titans East Special one-shot released in November 2007, revealing that Cyborg's team survived the attack, except Power Boy, dead after being impaled. The team's new line up consists of former New Teen Titans Nightwing, The Flash (Wally West), Donna Troy, Beast Boy, Raven, Cyborg, Red Arrow and Starfire.

In the series' first story, Trigon makes a series of attacks on every member, former or current, of the Teen Titans and Trigon has "another child" that, unlike Raven, will assist him in his attack. After reclaiming Titans Island and establishing a headquarters on the East River, Cyborg sets out to create an East Coast Titans team. During a training session, the team was massacred by an unseen force. Though Cyborg survives, Titans' members past and present are attacked by demonic entities across the globe. Raven, sensing Trigon's presence once again, calls upon her former Titans allies to defeat her fiendish father.

After rescuing several Titans and questioning Trigon himself, the Titans learn that Trigon's three children have prepared his second invasion for him. Raven's three grown half brothers — Jacob, Jared and Jesse are responsible. Working as a team, the Titans thwart the Sons of Trigon and stop Trigon's invasion plan. Following this adventure, Raven chooses her adopted family over her biological family, Red Arrow decided to join his former teammates (although both he and Flash retain their JLA membership) and the Titans were back together as a team.

Following this, the team settles at Titans Tower (the New York base), to recover from the events. While Dick and Kory attempt to make a decision on where their relationship will lead, Raven and Beast Boy go out on a "not-a-date". During this, Raven reveals that since she faced her brothers, she has begun to feel as if she is losing control and slipping back under her father's influence. Although Beast Boy rejects the idea, he is unexpectedly blind-sided as Raven gives in to her darker side, under the influence of her half-brother's coaxing. Using her teleporting powers, she and the sons of Trigon vanish, leaving a distraught Beast Boy to warn the others. Using a gemstone that carries Raven's pure essence within it, the Titans free Raven of her father's evil. As a result, Raven leaves each Titan with an amulet that can be used to cleanse any evil influence from her body.

Following this, Jericho arrives, frantically asking for help to separate himself from Match's body. Jericho has turned renegade again and fights the Titans. He is under the control of the numerous people that he has taken command of over the years. Nightwing resigns from the Titans due to his new responsibilities in Gotham.

Brightest Day: Titans – Villains for Hire

A Comic-Con announcement stated that Cyborg, Donna Troy and Starfire were leaving the team to pursue the JLA. Red Arrow, with his daughter Lian, has already relocated and is no longer involved with the Titans, but he got a spotlight in issue #23 after what happens to him in Justice League: Cry for Justice #5. After a series of spotlight issues, Final Crisis Aftermath: INK writer-artist creative team Eric Wallace and Fabrizio Fiorentino took over. Deathstroke took over the team with the Tattooed Man and Cheshire.

One of the new members included Carla Monetti a.k.a. Cinder, a young redheaded woman with the ability to manipulate fire. Osiris, a member during the One Year Later gap, who had been brought back to life after the events of Blackest Night, returned as a member. The final issue of the limited series, Justice League: The Rise of Arsenal ended with an advertisement stating that Arsenal's storyline would continue.

The team debuted in the one-shot issue Titans: Villains for Hire, where they are hired to assassinate Ryan Choi (the Atom) in his home in Ivy Town. The issue quickly became the subject of controversy due to Choi's violent death. Allegations of racial insensitivity dogged DC over the decision to kill off a relatively high-profile Asian character.

Following the one-shot, in the team's inaugural storyline they were hired to assassinate Lex Luthor following the events of War of the Supermen. This is revealed to be a ruse set up by Luthor and Deathstroke to draw out the real assassin, a shape-shifter named "Facade", who had apparently killed and impersonated a woman on Luthor's security detail.

Following several adventures, the Titans are confronted by Ray Palmer and the Justice League for their hand in Ryan's murder. The Titans are nearly defeated, but manage to escape thanks to an intervention from the newly resurrected Isis. Following the battle with the Justice League, Titans concluded with a two-part storyline which saw Jericho's return. The series ended with Arsenal battling Slade for control of the team and the Titans ultimately disbanding and Arsenal taking Jericho under his wing, leaving Slade alone once again.

The New 52 (2011–2016)

DC Comics relaunched Teen Titans with issue #1 (cover dated November 2011) as part of DC's New 52 event, written by Scott Lobdell with former Justice League artist Brett Booth providing interiors. The relaunch was controversial, because it was originally designed as a direct continuation of the previous Teen Titans series before Dan DiDio declared that all previous incarnations of the Titans never existed; this in spite of the fact that early issues of the 2011 series (as well as "Red Hood and the Outlaws" and "Batwoman") made explicit mention of the previous Teen Titans teams.

The new team is formed by Tim Drake, now rebranded as "Red Robin" in order to protect teenage heroes from a villain known as Harvest and his organization "N.O.W.H.E.R.E." A running theme for the 2011–2014 series was Harvest kidnapping young heroes for experimentation and enslavement as part of the villainous scheme for world domination.

The 2011–2014 series featured several crossovers, "The Culling", which had the team meet the Legion of Super-Heroes, as well as "Death of the Family", which focused upon a meeting of Batgirl, Red Hood and the Outlaws, and the Titans, as the Joker kidnapped Red Hood and Red Robin. The 2012 "Zero Month" issue provided the New 52 origin of Tim Drake, recasting him as a young computer hacker who was adopted by Batman to protect him from retaliation from the Penguin.

The 2011–2014 series and Scott Lodbell's writing drew negative reviews, though the Lodbell created character Bunker was positively received by fans. Criticism included the meandering Harvest/N.O.W.H.E.R.E storyline, an arc that revealed Kid Flash (Bart Allen) as a futuristic fundamentalist Christian terrorist hiding in the 20th century, as well as the elimination of the franchise's lore. The character of Raven and Trigon was originally embargoed by Lobdell, but the characters were brought back due to fan demand. The 2011 series also spawned a short-lived spin-off, The Ravagers, which ran for 10 issues and featured Beast Boy, Terra and Caitlyn Fairchild of Gen¹³ in major roles.

The series was relaunched in July with a new issue #1 with Will Pfeifer as writer. The series continued with the characteristics of the main characters, but ignored the events of the Ravagers spin-off, presenting Beast Boy both green and in line with his animated series characteristics. The series also added an African American version of the super-heroine Power Girl to the roster.

Due to the backlash against the removal of the previous incarnations of the Titans (and the ripple effect it had upon characters such as Nightwing and Donna Troy), DC launched a new miniseries called "Titans Hunt", which restored the original 1960s version of the Titans to canon. The series states that all memory of the original Titans was erased by Lilith to protect the team from Mr. Twister. It also alludes to further reality alterations to the DC Universe; these are then picked up on in the DC Rebirth initiative, beginning a week after "Titans Hunt", which restores Wally West to canon, along with various aspects of the Pre-Flashpoint continuity.

DC Rebirth (2016–2020)
The June 2016 DC Rebirth relaunch established two Titans teams: the Titans, with Nightwing, The Flash (Wally West), Lilith, Arsenal, Donna Troy, the Bumblebee and Tempest; and the Teen Titans, consisting of Damian Wayne as Robin, Wallace West as Kid Flash, Jackson Hyde as Aqualad, Beast Boy, Starfire and Raven. Titans writer Dan Abnett confirmed in an interview with Newsarama that Titans characters the Hawk and the Dove, the Herald, Gnarrk and others would be appearing in the new series as well. After the Lazarus Contract event, Wallace West is fired from the Teen Titans and joins Defiance, Deathstroke's version of the Titans. However, Wallace returns to the Teen Titans in issue #14. In Super Sons #7, Superboy (Jonathan Samuel Kent) acts as a temporary member.

As part of the "New Justice" banner for DC Comics, both teams underwent changes in their roster, with Nightwing, Donna Troy, Raven, Steel (Natasha Irons), Beast Boy, Miss Martian and eventually Green Lantern (Kyle Rayner), and Robin, Kid Flash, Red Arrow (Emiko Queen), Crush (Lobo's daughter), Djinn, and Roundhouse for the Teen Titans. The Titans series ended its run at issue #36 (April 2019), while Teen Titans is currently planned to be ending its run in November 2020 at issue #47.

Infinite Frontier (2021–2022)
In the Teen Titans Academy series, the adult generation of Titans (Nightwing, Starfire, Donna Troy, Beast Boy, Cyborg, and Raven) serve as faculty of a new superhero academy designed to mentor the heroes of tomorrow. Its upperclassmen are the active Teen Titans squad (Bunker, Roundhouse, Crush, Kid Flash III, Red Arrow II, and Jakeem Thunder), while its new students include three bat-themed Gotham residents (the brawny Megabat, techy Bratgirl, and bat-like metahuman Chupacabra) collectively known as the Bat Pack; the established superhero Billy Batson; paraplegic speedster Bolt; EMP-generating Brick Pettirosso; nonbinary ragdoll and apprentice to Doctor Fate, Stitch; Raven's star pupil, Dane; tubular shapeshifter Marvin "Tooby" Murakami; ice-wielder Summer Zahid; simian superhero Gorilla Gregg, nephew of Grodd; Hero dial wielder Miguel Montez; green-prehensile-haired Tress; and the amnesiac, super strong, Matt Price. As the new students and faculty of the academy attempt to establish their new school, they are plagued by appearances of someone assuming the costume of Red X, once worn by Dick Grayson and another mysterious copycat. 

As time goes on, the team discover that Dane is the half-demon antichrist, and under the alias Nevermore (reflecting his similarities to Raven), is destined to bring about the apocalypse. In the first story arc's conclusion, the mysterious third Red X is revealed to be Brick, operating under the false belief that Dick Grayson is his father; he was manipulated by the second Red X, who bears a longstanding grudge against Grayson. Dane and Brick's attacks on the Academy cause the structure to collapse, but the students manage to prevent all but minimal casualties. Matt Price fires optic blasts in the final confrontation, indicating to onlookers that he might be Kryptonian, but Grayson deduces he must be something else, as the blasts give off no heat, more closely resembling Darkseid's Omega Beams. 

Concurrently, in the comic book limited series Titans United, the core roster of Titans is joined by new Titans Red Hood (Jason Todd) and Superboy (Conner Kent), in place of Cyborg; no story is given for how the roster was assembled. This is intended as a commercial tie-in to the concurrent Titans TV series but is set in, or something very much like, current DC continuity Red X was also in the issue the fall of the Teen titans academy begins he was fighting  Shazam (Billy Batson) and in another issue that Speedy (Roy Harper) meets Flash.

Dawn of DC (2023-present) 
Following the events of Dark Crisis on Infinite Earths and durning the Tom Taylor run on Nightwing, Superman approaches Nightwing with the proposition that he serve as the leader of the new superhero team, after the Justice League disbands. This leads to Nightwing unveiling a new Titans Tower in Bludhaven with the team consisting of him, The Flash (Wally West), Donna Troy, Beast Boy, Cyborg, Starfire and Raven. This will lead into a new Titans series written by Taylor and illustrated by Nicola Scott.

Titans Tower

Titans Tower is the headquarters of the Teen Titans. The first tower was located in New York City, while later series depict it in California, usually the San Francisco bay area. Although the location and actual look of the tower has changed throughout the various series, there are a few defining characteristics, such as always being shaped to resemble the letter "T". In some series the tower is often colored like sky blue or silver.

Enemies

Collected editions

Silver Age Teen Titans

New Teen Titans

New Titans

The Titans

Teen Titans (vol. 3) (2003–2011)
Note: Issues #27–28, penciled by artist Rob Liefeld and written by Gail Simone, are not collected in any of the trade paperbacks and were reprinted in DC Comics Presents: Brightest Day #3 (Feb. 2011), which also included Legends of the DC Universe #26–27 (tying in with characters spotlighted in Brightest Day). Issues #48–49, which tie in with the "Amazons Attack" Wonder Woman story, are likewise not collected in any trade paperback.

Titans (vol. 2) (2008–2011)

The New 52 Teen Titans (vols. 4–5) (2011–2014)

DC Rebirth Titans (vol. 3) (2016–2019), Teen Titans (vol. 6) (2016–2020)

Teen Titans Academy (2021-2022), Titans United (2021)

Other versions
A similar team, the Teen Tyrants (based on the Crime Syndicate), appear in issue #48 of the comic book spin-off. The roster consists of Red Robin (the parallel Earth counterpart of Dick Grayson, not the actual Red Robin), Tempest (the parallel Earth counterpart of Aqualad), Arsenal (counterpart of Speedy), Red Raven (counterpart of Raven) and Blackfire (counterpart of Starfire, not Blackfire). Their appearances are similar to their counterparts with a few differences. Red Robin's eyes are red, and he sports a red version of his counterpart's costume (albeit with a large grey "R" across his chest); Tempest wears a costume that his counterpart wears much later, has a hook in place of his left hand and has shorter hair; Arsenal has an "A" on his belt buckle and has a goatee; Red Raven wears a red version of her counterpart's costume and has pink hair; Blackfire wears red instead of purple and has black hair. There are no evil counterparts of Cyborg or Beast Boy, despite both of them being part of the Teen Titans. The Teen Tyrants appear when Raven attempts to send Killowat back to his own time, but he is accidentally sent to the Teen Tyrants' dimension, where they have conquered Jump City. He is held captive after being assumed of being part of the Brotherhood of Justice (the parallel Earth Brotherhood of Evil, but non-villainous). The Teen Titans travel to that dimension to rescue him, but once they step through the portal, they fight the Tyrants and are defeated. The Teen Tyrants attempt to conquer their counterparts' universe, until Blackfire reveals that she is working undercover for the Brotherhood of Justice, whom she summons, and they help the Titans defeat the Tyrants. Killowat is then freed and sent back to his dimension.

Smallville: Titans
In the Smallville Season 11 series (based on the TV series) under writer Bryan Q. Miller, a version of the Titans was used, called Smallville: Titans. The Titans feature Conner Kent/Superboy, Speedy, Blue Beetle, Miss Martian and Zan and Jayna as students at Jay Garrick's San Francisco school for the "gifted". Rachel Roth later joins the team in Smallville: Harbinger.

In other media

Television

Live action

A live action series entitled Titans premiered in 2018 for DC Universe, developed and executive produced by Akiva Goldsman, Geoff Johns, Greg Berlanti, and Sarah Schechter. The series was created after plans for a live action Titans series on TNT were cancelled. It stars Brenton Thwaites as Dick Grayson, Anna Diop as Kory Anders, Teagan Croft as Rachel Roth, and Ryan Potter as Gar Logan, Curran Walters as Jason Todd, Conor Leslie as Donna Troy, Minka Kelly as Dawn Granger, Alan Ritchson as Hank Hall, Esai Morales as Deathstroke, Chelsea Zang as Rose Wilson, and Joshua Orpin as Conner. Don Hall, Garth, Jericho, and Blackfire also appear in the series, portrayed by Elliot Knight, Drew Van Acker, Chella Man, and Damaris Lewis, respectively. The series is set about fifteen years after Dick first becoming Robin, portraying two different generations of the team. The first generation, set in the series' past, includes Robin, Aqualad, Wonder Girl, Hawk, and Dove. Later, Starfire, Raven, Beast Boy, Superboy, and Jason Todd as Robin are recruited. Starfire is a similar age as Dick, while the other new members are a generation younger. In 2021, the series moved to HBO Max, as DC Universe was reconfigured into being solely a comics hub and ceased being a streaming service.

Animation

 The team's first animated appearance was in the 1967 Filmation series The Superman/Aquaman Hour of Adventure, featuring Speedy (Pat Harrington, Jr.), Kid Flash (Tommy Cook), Wonder Girl (Julie Bennett), and Aqualad (Jerry Dexter) as the team's lineup. Three segments were created that centered around the Teen Titans.
 Wonder Girl, Starfire, Raven, Cyborg, Beast Boy, Kid Flash and Protector appeared on a 1984 Keebler anti-drug commercial.

 A Teen Titans animated series ran on Cartoon Network for five seasons from July 19, 2003, to September 15, 2006, and featured a 1980s-era lineup composed of Robin (Scott Menville), Starfire (Hynden Walch), Cyborg (Khary Payton), Raven (Tara Strong), and Beast Boy (Greg Cipes). Each of the five seasons featured a main story arc, as well as stand-alone episodes. The series also had a run on Kids WB, and adapted some Wolfman/Pérez storylines (including "The Judas Contract" and "The Terror of Trigon") and featured versions of many other Titans characters, including Aqualad (Wil Wheaton), Speedy (Mike Erwin), Slade (Ron Perlman), Bumblebee (T'Keyah Crystal Keymáh), Kid Flash (Michael Rosenbaum) and Terra (Ashley Johnson). Most of the stories, however, were original and the show also introduced new characters. After the show's completion, the movie Teen Titans: Trouble in Tokyo premiered on Kids' WB! on September 16, 2006. The series spawned a related comic book (Teen Titans Go!) and two video games, one for console and one for GBA.
 While not explicitly called the Teen Titans, the team does appear in Batman: The Brave and the Bold with Robin (/Jeremy Shada), Speedy (Jason Marsden/Ryan Ochoa), and Aqualad (Zack Shada/Zachary Gordon) as a crime fighting trio, similar to the original three, with the exception of Speedy replacing Kid Flash. In the episode "Sidekicks Assemble!", a flashback shows them in a training simulator where Speedy brings up that when they grow older, they can join forces (like they do as the Titans in the comics). Robin initially opposes the idea, but changes his mind when he defeats the most villains and declares himself the team leader. When they grow older, they team up and try taking down higher level villains, but their mentors think they are not ready. When the three attempt to stop the latest scheme of Ra's Al Ghul, Batman tries tricking Robin into picking an easy mission instead of Ghul's hideout, only for the three to successfully stopped the supervillain with the help of their mentors. Robin becomes Nightwing at the end of the episode. Kid Flash (Hunter Parrish) also makes an appearance in the episode "Requiem for a Scarlet Speedster!".
 In November 2010, the Young Justice animated television series was launched on Cartoon Network, featuring a team of teenaged superhero sidekicks who undertake covert operations under the authority of the Justice League. Despite its title, the show is not an adaptation of the Young Justice comic series, but rather an adaptation of the entire DC Universe with a focus on its young superheroes. The television series is based on a cross between the Teen Titans and Young Justice franchises, drawing influences from 1960s Teen Titans run and the 1990s Young Justice run in addition to recent Teen Titans comics. The series was cancelled after two seasons in 2013, but returned in 2019 for a third season on DC Universe and a fourth season in 2022 on HBO Max. The team line-up reflects the variety of sources on which the show is based: Dick Grayson (Jesse McCartney) as Robin, Wally West (Jason Spisak) as Kid Flash, Conner Kent (Nolan North) as Superboy, Miss Martian (Danica McKellar), Artemis (Stephanie Lemelin), and Kaldur'ahm (Khary Payton) as Aqualad. Later in the first season, the team adds Zatanna (Lacey Chabert), Rocket (Kali Troy/Denise Boutte), and Roy Harper as Red Arrow (formerly Speedy) (Crispin Freeman) to its roster. In the show's second season, Cassandra Sandsmark (Mae Whitman) as Wonder Girl, Tim Drake (Cameron Bowen) as Robin, Beast Boy (Logan Grove/Greg Cipes), Barbara Gordon (Alyson Stoner) as Batgirl, Bumblebee (Masasa Moyo), Jaime Reyes (Eric Lopez) as Blue Beetle, Mal Duncan (Kevin Michael Richardson), and Static (Bryton James) join the team. In the show's third season, Spoiler (Mae Whitman), Thirteen (Lauren Tom), Cissie King-Jones as Arrowette (Kelly Stables), and Arsenal (Crispin Freeman) join the team. The second saga of the third season focuses on how Terra (Tara Strong) (who is the Princess of Marokvia in this version) fights alongside the team. It also involves Beast Boy leading a Teen Titans-esque public team called the Outsiders, to promote hope and inspiration for metahuman children, consisting of Geo-Force, Wonder Girl, Blue Beetle, Kid Flash and Static.
 In season 2 of Mad, Cyborg appeared in a contest and in the next episode, the Teen Titans (Robin, Raven, Cyborg, Beast Boy, Starfire, Blue Beetle, Superboy, Kid Flash, Wonder Girl and Aqualad) get spoofed along with Titanic.
 During the premiere of Green Lantern: The Animated Series on Cartoon Network, a new block of animation with the Green Lantern and Young Justice shows alongside the DC Nation Shorts was announced for 2012. One of these shorts on DC Nation Shorts previewed was a chibi version of the Teen Titans, using the art style and voice actors of the Teen Titans 2003 TV series. Formerly known as the New Teen Titans, the principal cast members reprised their roles as the lead Titans.
 After a test run with DC Nation's New Teen Titans shorts, a new full-length series called Teen Titans Go! premiered in 2013 on Cartoon Network, with Scott Menville, Hynden Walch, Khary Payton, Tara Strong, and Greg Cipes reprising their roles as Robin, Starfire, Cyborg, Raven, and Beast Boy. This series takes a comedic look at the Titans' day-to-day lives when they are not fighting crime.
 An animated series loosely set in the DC Animated Universe was planned, but abandoned. However, the team itself exists and is mentioned in the Static Shock episode "Hard as Nails", with Robin (Tim Drake) confirmed to be a member by Batman when Static asks the former where he is and Static is told by him that he will meet the team eventually; Beast Boy is also alluded to in another episode. 
 The Teen Titans appear in the DC Super Hero Girls episode "#TweenTitans". They are a team of preteen superheroes led by Robin (voiced by Keith Ferguson). The other members are Starfire (voiced by Grey Griffin), Beast Boy (voiced by Kari Wahlgren), Cyborg (voiced by Phil LaMarr), and Raven (reprised by Tara Strong).
 The Teen Titans are alluded to in the third season of Harley Quinn, when Nightwing makes his return to Gotham City to rejoin the Bat-family. While detailing what he's been up to since retiring as Robin, it is mentioned that he was on the team.

Film

Live action
In May 2007, it was revealed that Warner Bros. was in development on a Teen Titans film in which Robin was the only confirmed member. Akiva Goldsman and Mark Verheiden were writing it. The current status of the film remains unknown because on September 11, 2014, it was announced that Akiva Goldsman was developing a Teen Titans TV series called Titans. Heroic Hollywood's El Mayimbe was a guest on the October 13, 2015 episode of Collider Heroes and he mentioned that Warner Bros. is developing both a Teen Titans movie with Cyborg, among others, and an all-female group of heroes.

Animation
 The Titans appear in a brief background cameo during the closing JFK speech in the 2008 animated film Justice League: The New Frontier.
 The Teen Titans appear in the DC Animated Movie Universe.
 They are first featured in the 2016 film Justice League vs. Teen Titans, which is the first major appearance of the team in the DC Universe Animated Original Movies line. The lineup for this version includes Damian Wayne (Stuart Allan), Starfire (Kari Wahlgren), Raven (Taissa Farmiga), Jaime Reyes (Jake T. Austin), and Beast Boy (Brandon Soo Hoo). Cyborg (Shemar Moore) also appears as a member of the Justice League, but still meets with the Teen Titans and the opening of the credits imply that Nightwing (Sean Maher) is occasionally part of the team. Terra is seen heading towards Titans Tower in the mid-credits scene. 
 Teen Titans: The Judas Contract, an adaptation of the storyline of the same name, was released in 2017. The film was first announced in 2006, but was shelved due to a lack of a "broad fanbase appeal" before resurfacing a decade later. Sean Maher, Kari Wahlgren, Jake T. Austin, Taissa Farmiga, Brandon Soo Hoo, and Stuart Allan return as Dick Grayson, Starfire, Jamie Reyes, Raven, Beast Boy, and Damian Wayne, with Christina Ricci and Miguel Ferrer joining the cast as Terra and Deathstroke, respectively. A flashback shows Kid Flash (Jason Spisak), Speedy (Crispin Freeman) and Bumblebee (Masasa Moyo) along with Dick Grayson (Robin), Beast Boy and Starfire as the original roster.
 The Teen Titans appear in Justice League Dark: Apokolips War. Along with the previous and current members, (except for Kid Flash) featured in Justice League vs. Teen Titans and Teen Titans: The Judas Contract, the lineup also consists of Superboy (introduced in Reign of the Supermen), Wonder Girl (as introduced in the epilogue of Teen Titans: The Judas Contract), and the Wallace West incarnation of Kid Flash.

Video games
 Artificial Mind and Movement developed two Teen Titans games based on the 2003 animated series. The first game was released on the Game Boy Advance platform in 2005, and the second Teen Titans game was released in 2006 for the PlayStation 2, Xbox and GameCube.
 The Teen Titans appear in DC Universe Online.
 Teen Titans members Nightwing (Dick Grayson), Raven and Cyborg are playable in Injustice: Gods Among Us. In Green Lantern's chapter, they are referenced by the alternate Cyborg and Raven as they torture the alternate Deathstroke where it was mentioned that most of their fellow Teen Titans members died in Metropolis five years earlier. It is also revealed that Damian Wayne was responsible for Dick Grayson's death and that he eventually became this universe's Nightwing. In the comic book tie-in, it is revealed to be Beast Boy and Kid Flash, while Superboy, Starfire, Wonder Girl and Red Robin are put into the Phantom Zone by Superman. There is also a DLC including alternate skins for Cyborg, Raven, and Deathstroke available that are based on their designs for their first appearances in the Teen Titans comic series. In Deathstroke's ending, a clan of assassins formed by him is named after the New Titans.
 In Injustice 2 Cyborg is a playable character, Nightwing's staff is playable as a variation of Robin, and Starfire was added as a DLC character. Cyborg mentions in the story mode that he joined Superman's regime to avenge the deaths of Beast Boy and Starfire in Metropolis (even though the latter didn't die in Metropolis in the comic tie-in). In Cyborg's ending, he uses his powers to bring back the missing Titans members (Superboy, Starfire, Wonder Girl, and Red Robin) to aid him in restoring the thousands of worlds Brainiac stole. In Starfire's ending, she is the last of the original Titans as Dick Grayson and Beast Boy were killed prior to the first game while Cyborg and Raven have joined the Regime. To overcome her losses, she forms a new team of Titans with Blue Beetle, Firestorm, and Supergirl.

See also

 List of Teen Titans members
 List of Teen Titans comics

Notes

References

External links
 
 Titans at DC Comics.com
 Teen Titans, The New Teen Titans, The New Teen Titans vol. 2 and Teen Titans vol. 2 at Mike's Amazing World of Comics
 Teen Titans (1964) at Don Markstein's Toonopedia. Archived from the original on March 28, 2016.
 Teen Titans (1980) at Don Markstein's Toonopedia. Archived from the original on March 28, 2016.
 Sean McKeever on the Teen Titans in His Future

 
1966 comics debuts
New Teen Titans
DC Comics American superheroes
Characters created by Bob Haney
Characters created by George Pérez
Characters created by Marv Wolfman
Child characters in comics
Teenage characters in comics
Teenage superheroes
Comics by Bob Haney
Comics by George Pérez
Comics by Dan Jurgens
Comics by Geoff Johns
Comics by Marv Wolfman
Comics characters introduced in 1964
DC Comics superhero teams
DC Comics titles